In mathematics, a cardinal number κ is called huge if there exists an elementary embedding j : V → M from V into a transitive inner model M with critical point κ and

Here, αM is the class of all sequences of length α whose elements are in M.

Variants 
In what follows, jn refers to the n-th iterate of the elementary embedding j, that is, j composed with itself n times, for a finite ordinal n.  Also, <αM is the class of all sequences of length less than α whose elements are in M.  Notice that for the "super" versions, γ should be less than j(κ), not .

κ is almost n-huge if and only if there is j : V → M with critical point κ and

κ is super almost n-huge if and only if for every ordinal γ there is j : V → M with critical point κ, γ<j(κ), and

κ is n-huge if and only if there is j : V → M with critical point κ and

κ is super n-huge if and only if for every ordinal γ there is j : V → M with critical point κ, γ<j(κ), and

Notice that 0-huge is the same as measurable cardinal; and 1-huge is the same as huge. A cardinal satisfying one of the rank into rank axioms is n-huge for all finite n.

The existence of an almost huge cardinal implies that Vopěnka's principle is consistent; more precisely any almost huge cardinal is also a Vopěnka cardinal.

Consistency strength 
The cardinals are arranged in order of increasing consistency strength as follows:
almost n-huge
super almost n-huge
n-huge
super n-huge
almost n+1-huge
The consistency of a huge cardinal implies the consistency of a supercompact cardinal, nevertheless, the least huge cardinal is smaller than the least supercompact cardinal (assuming both exist).

ω-huge cardinals
One can try defining an ω-huge cardinal κ as one such that an elementary embedding j : V → M from V into a transitive inner model M with critical point κ and λM⊆M, where λ is the supremum of jn(κ) for positive integers n. However Kunen's inconsistency theorem  shows that such cardinals are inconsistent in ZFC, though it is still open whether they are consistent in ZF. Instead an ω-huge cardinal κ is defined as the critical point of an elementary embedding from some rank Vλ+1 to itself. This is closely related to the rank-into-rank axiom I1.

See also 

List of large cardinal properties
The Dehornoy order on a braid group was motivated by properties of huge cardinals.

References 
.
.
. A copy of parts I and II of this article with corrections is available at the author's web page.

Large cardinals